The 1976 United States Senate election in Michigan took place on November 2, 1976. Incumbent Democratic U.S. Senator Philip Hart decided to retire instead of seeking a fourth term. Republican turned Democrat Representative Donald Riegle won the open seat.

Democratic primary

Candidates
Richard H. Austin, Michigan Secretary of State
James L. Elsman
James G. O'Hara, U.S. Representative from Utica
Donald Riegle, U.S. Representative from Flint

Results

Republican primary

Candidates
Deane Baker
Thomas E. Brennan, former Justice of the Michigan Supreme Court
Marvin L. Esch, U.S. Representative from Ann Arbor
Robert J. Huber, U.S. Representative from Troy and candidate for U.S. Senate in 1970

Results

General election

Results

Aftermath 
Incumbent Senator Hart died of melanoma on December 26, and Riegle was appointed to finish the remaining days of his final term in office, giving him seniority over his freshman colleagues.

See also 
 1976 United States Senate elections

References

Michigan
1976
1976 Michigan elections